The Waldstein is a mountain range in the northern part of the Fichtel Mountains in Upper Franconia, Bavaria, in southern Germany.

Geography 
In addition, the Epprechtstein, the Kleiner Waldstein and the ridge of the Hallerstein Forest, south of the town Hallerstein are all located in this mountain range. To the east the Großer Kornberg is the end of the mountain chain, while in the west it falls gently away at Gefrees.

Geology 
Geologically the massif consists mainly of granite. The history of its orogeny begins in the Precambrian about 750–800 million years ago – almost 20% of the  earth's history. Only a few of these mountain stump ranges (Rumpfgebirge) remain today.

Language and settlement 
The eastern part of the Waldstein ridge forms an approximate linguistic boundary between the East Franconian and Bavarian dialects, because settlement developed along the rivers rising in the Fichtelgebirge mountains: the Saale, White Main Eger and Fichtelnaab.

Structures 
On the Großen Waldstein is the Großer Waldstein transmitter. On the Epprechtstein are the ruins of Epprechtstein Castle.

Maps 
 Fritsch Wanderkarte 1:50,000 scale - Fichtelgebirge-Steinwald

Gallery

External links
Waldstein 

Fichtel Mountains
Central Uplands
Mountain ranges of Bavaria
Hof (district)